NOLS may refer to:

 Nols Creations, artist located in the Netherlands
 National Outdoor Leadership School,  United States, a wilderness education institution
 National Organisation of Labour Students, United Kingdom, now known simply as Labour Students